Many arterial roads in the Phoenix metropolitan area have the same name in multiple cities or towns. Some roads change names or route numbers across town borders, resulting in occasional confusion. For example, the road known as Apache Boulevard in Tempe continues east as Main Street in neighboring Mesa and then as Apache Trail in Apache Junction. Although Broadway Road maintains the same name through Goodyear, Avondale, Phoenix, Tempe, Mesa, and Apache Junction, each town uses a different reference point for address numbers.

Arizona Avenue

Arizona Avenue is a north–south arterial road in the southeastern part of the Phoenix metropolitan area. The highway comprises the portion of Arizona State Route 87 (SR 87) within the city of Chandler. The entire length of Arizona Avenue is part of the National Highway System as a principal arterial.

Arizona Avenue begins at Hunt Highway, which forms the south city limit of Chandler and also the Maricopa–Pinal county line. This intersection also forms the northern terminus of SR 587; SR 87 briefly heads east on Hunt Highway before turning southeast fully into Pinal County. Arizona Avenue heads north as a four-lane divided highway. Between Riggs Road and Chandler Heights Road, the road expands to six lanes. North of its diamond interchange with SR 202 (Santan Freeway), the highway reduces to four lanes and passes through downtown Chandler. At the north end of downtown, Arizona Avenue passes the Chandler Center for the Arts and Chandler High School and becomes a six-lane road with center turn lane. The highway continues through an intersection with Elliot Road to the Western Canal, where SR 87 continues north into the city of Mesa as Country Club Drive.

Baseline Road

Baseline Road is a significant east-west arterial road. This road is so named because it runs along the length of the primary baseline for Arizona as given under the Public Land Survey System.

This line runs east-west from the "zero point" atop a hill near the confluence of the Gila and Salt rivers, on Avondale Boulevard (115th Avenue) at Baseline Road. This site is next to Phoenix Raceway. Avondale Boulevard is laid out atop the north-south base meridian, called the Gila and Salt River meridian.

Due to natural obstructions, Baseline is not continuous. The road is located in Maricopa County and Pinal County. There is also a rural road named Baseline Road in southern La Paz County close to the Colorado River which is located near Arizona's baseline.

Because of the grid plan used by cities in Arizona, the name for the road is applied for non-contiguous sections and is theoretically reserved for future east-west roads built at the same latitude.

Route description
Starting from east, the road begins in Apache Junction in Pinal County, named Baseline Avenue and is a small segment of thoroughfare in a residential neighborhood at the foothills of the Superstition Mountains. The route picks up again and runs due westward, running parallel to US 60. At the Maricopa County border, the road enters Mesa and is named Baseline Road. It becomes a major arterial road as it passes through Gilbert and Tempe. In Tempe, it intersects Loop 101 and then Interstate 10. Continuing, the road runs through south Phoenix and the major arterial segment of the road terminates in the Gila River Indian Community, approximately where the Salt River joins the Gila River.

The road reappears on the other side of the Gila River at an orthogonal junction with Perryville Rd. as CR-85 and continues westward through central Buckeye. From there, it continues through farmland in western Maricopa county in various non-continuous segments. The segment of Baseline Road farthest west in Maricopa County is just past 547th Avenue.

Due to the ease of navigation on this extremely long route, as well as the significant number of municipalities that the route encompasses, it is a favorite street for those electing not to use Phoenix's many freeways such as I-10 and US 60.

Landmarks 
Notable locations along or near Baseline Road include Arizona Mills and Phoenix International Raceway. Baseline Road runs through the historical farming community of Laveen.

Bell Road

Bell Road is a major east-west arterial road in northern metropolitan Phoenix. Bell Road is one of the few roadways to cross the Agua Fria River in the northern part of the metro area, providing a link between the growing suburb of Surprise with Phoenix. As a result, the portion of Bell Road passing through Surprise and Sun City is the busiest arterial road in the state of Arizona.

Route description

Traveling west, the road intersects with State Route 51 and Interstate 17 in Phoenix, the western leg of State Route 101 in Peoria, and U.S. Route 60 and State Route 303 in Surprise. West of the Beardsley Canal, the roadway curves around the White Tank Mountain Regional Park, becoming the Sun Valley Parkway through northern Buckeye.

East of 66th Street, Bell Road takes a south-easterly bend and, at its intersection with Scottsdale Road, becomes Frank Lloyd Wright Boulevard, named in recognition of architect and designer Frank Lloyd Wright. This alignment was built in the mid-1970s during the construction of the CAP canal.

Landmarks

Prominent locations on or near Bell Road include the Scottsdale Municipal Airport, Turf Paradise, The Villas on Bell, Arrowhead Towne Center and the Peoria Sports Complex. Bell Road also forms the boundary of the original town site of Surprise.

Camelback Road

Camelback Road is a prominent street in the Phoenix metropolitan area.

The street stretches continuously for approximately 33 miles from Scottsdale in the east to Litchfield Park in the west, and runs through the city of Phoenix. Scottsdale Fashion Square is located at the corner of Camelback and Scottsdale Roads.

Camelback Road runs directly south of Phoenix's famous Camelback Mountain and the Phoenician Resort. Further west, the upscale Biltmore district of Phoenix is located along Camelback Road, including the Arizona Biltmore Hotel (to the north), Biltmore Fashion Park, as well as one of Phoenix's primary business districts (sometimes called the Camelback Corridor).

In Litchfield Park, Camelback Road passes the historic Wigwam Resort, built in 1918.

West of Litchfield Park, Camelback Road skirts the southern boundary of Luke Air Force Base.

Carefree Highway

Carefree Highway is an east–west arterial road in the northern part of the Phoenix metropolitan area. The highway begins where Arizona State Route 74 (SR 74) meets the north end of Lake Pleasant Parkway in northern Peoria; SR 74 continues west along Lake Pleasant Road. Carefree Highway extends east through Interstate 17 (I-17), which is the eastern terminus of SR 74, to Scottsdale Road on the border of Scottsdale and Carefree. The entire length of Carefree Highway is part of the National Highway System as a principal arterial. Carefree Highway is the inspiration for Gordon Lightfoot's eponymous song.

Carefree Highway begins at Lake Pleasant Parkway in a rural part of the city of Peoria; SR 74 continues west as Lake Pleasant Road toward its western terminus at U.S. Route 60 near Morristown. Carefree Highway heads east as a two-lane road through open desert in the northern parts of Peoria and then the North Gateway urban village of the city of Phoenix. Shortly before reaching I-17 (Arizona Veterans Highway), the highway passes the Ben Avery Shooting Facility. SR 74 reaches its eastern terminus at the partial cloverleaf interchange with I-17; Carefree Road continues east as a four-lane divided municipal highway. The highway curves through a mountain range before returning to its longitudinal course, along which it leaves the city of Phoenix and then follows the northern city limit along the Desert View urban village. Carefree Highway then follows the south town limit of Cave Creek and briefly enters that town around its intersection with Cave Creek Road. The highway drops to two lanes and follows the border between Scottsdale to the south and Carefree to the north before reaching its eastern terminus at a three-legged intersection with Scottsdale Road, which heads south into Scottsdale, and Tom Darlington Drive, which heads north into Carefree.

Cave Creek Road

Cave Creek Road is an arterial road in the north central part of the Phoenix metropolitan area. The highway is part of the National Highway System as a principal arterial from its southern terminus at Seventh Street in Phoenix north to Carefree Highway on the border of Cave Creek and Carefree. Cave Creek Road continues as a collector road north and east through Cave Creek, Carefree, and the far northern part of Scottsdale to its northern terminus near Camp Creek.

Cave Creek Road begins at a five-way intersection with north–south Seventh Street and east–west Dunlap Road in the North Mountain urban village of the city of Phoenix. The highway heads northeast as a four-lane road with center turn lane between North Mountain to the west and Stoney Mountain to the east. Cave Creek Road curves north as it enters the urban village of Paradise Valley and intersects another principal arterial, which heads northwest as Thunderbird Road and east as Cactus Road. The highway expands to six lanes and heads northeast along the west flank of Shadow Mountain before heading straight north through an intersection with Bell Road and becoming a six-lane divided highway at its a single-point urban interchange with Arizona State Route 101 (Pima Freeway). Cave Creek Road enters the Desert View urban village as it crosses over the Central Arizona Project aqueduct. The highway curves north-north-east toward Cave Creek, drops to four lanes, and passes through several miles of open desert between lobes of suburban sprawl. Cave Creek Road returns to the suburban sprawl of Desert View before the principal arterial portion of the highway ends at Carefree Highway.

Central Avenue

Central Avenue extends from South Mountain Park to North Mountain in Phoenix. The Central Avenue Corridor, roughly from Camelback Road to McDowell Road, is one of Phoenix's most heavily trafficked stretches of roadway. The Central Avenue Corridor bisects the area known as Midtown, Phoenix, a collection of neighborhoods north of Downtown and south of the North-Central and Sunnyslope areas.

For the most part, Central Avenue marks the "zero" point of east/west addresses in the Phoenix area.

Country Club Drive

Country Club Drive is a north–south arterial road in the southeastern part of the Phoenix metropolitan area. The highway comprises the portion of Arizona State Route 87 (SR 87) within the city of Mesa. The entire length of Country Club Drive is part of the National Highway System as a principal arterial.

Country Club Drive begins at the Western Canal at the south city limit of Mesa; SR 87 continues south into the city of Chandler as Arizona Avenue. Country Club Drive heads north as a six-lane road with center turn lane that becomes a divided highway at the south end of the S-curve in which the highway intersects Baseline Road. North of Baseline Road, the highway has a diamond interchange with U.S. Route 60 (Superstition Freeway). At the southwest corner of downtown Mesa, Country Club Drive has a one-quadrant interchange with Broadway Road and then immediately passes under the Union Pacific Railroad main line. West of downtown, the highway intersects Main Street and the Valley Metro Rail light rail immediately to the west of its Country Club/Main Street station. North of McKellips Road, Country Club Drive has a diamond interchange with SR 202 (Red Mountain Freeway) and reaches its northern terminus at SR 87's bridge across the Salt River. SR 87 continues north along Beeline Highway.

Elliot Road

Elliot Road is an east–west arterial road in the southeastern part of the Phoenix metropolitan area. The highway extends from 44th Street in far southern Phoenix east through Tempe, Chandler, Gilbert, and Mesa to Meridian Road at the Maricopa–Pinal county line. Elliot Road is part of the National Highway System as a principal arterial from Interstate 10 (I-10) at the Phoenix–Tempe border east to Arizona State Route 202 (SR 202) in Mesa.

Elliot Road begins at 44th Street in the Ahwatukee urban village of the city of Phoenix. The road loops southwest as Elliot Warner Loop, which curves counterclockwise to Warner Road, which parallels Elliot Road  to the south. Eliott Road begins as a four-lane road with center turn lane but expands to a six-lane divided highway at 48th Street. The highway leaves Phoenix and enters Tempe at its diamond interchange with I-10 (Maricopa Freeway). Within Tempe, Elliot Road intersects Rural Road. The highway meets SR 101 (Price Freeway) at a diamond interchange and enters Chandler, where the highway reduces to a four-lane road with center turn lane. Within Gilbert, the highway passes the historic Gilbert Elementary School building. At the Eastern Canal, Elliot Road becomes divided again, which the road stays until midway between Recker Road and Power Road. The highway continues with two lanes through Power Road, where the highway enters Mesa. Elliot Road crosses the East Maricopa Floodway and expands to a six-lane divided highway at its diamond interchange with SR 202 (Santan Freeway). The highway's median becomes a center turn lane shortly before the road reaches its eastern terminus at Meridian Road at the east city limit of Mesa, also the Maricopa–Pinal county line.

Grand Avenue

The portion of U.S. Route 60 that enters Phoenix from the northwest Valley is known as Grand Avenue, a street which slices through west Phoenix at a 45-degree angle.  This makes it instantly recognizable on any City of Phoenix map, and it represents the final leg of US 60 into the heart of Phoenix.  Although US 60 departs Grand Ave. at an interchange with 27th Avenue, Grand Ave. itself continues southeast towards the intersection of 7th Avenue and Van Buren Street.

As of 2006, Lower Grand Avenue, between Roosevelt Street on the north and Van Buren Street on the south, has been experiencing a renaissance, as art venues, bars, cafes and small businesses have emerged amid the work being done to restore historic properties, including decaying warehouses.

On the first and third Fridays of every month, Grand Avenue hosts cultural events. Some of the venues associated with the Grand Avenue art scene include the Trunk Space, the Lodge Art Parlor, ShopDevious, the Icon Gallery, the Chocolate Factory, the Paisley Violin, La Melgosa Complex: Deus Ex Machina, the Phoenix Fall Space, Stop n' Look & Comet's Corner, the Annex: Soul Invictus, the Lucky Rabbit & Gallery Marsiglia, Lady Luck Tattoo, and other design houses and studios.

As a result of this revitalization the Grand Avenue Merchants Association (GAMA) formed to address a "Grand New Vision" and to bring the Grand Avenue community together with other neighborhood associations to form an arts, culture and small business district with a mind towards adaptive reuse of historical buildings, infill projects and both small business and community based outreach.

In 2011, the City of Phoenix was chosen as one of five U.S. capitals to receive federal design assistance through the U.S. Environmental Protection Agency (EPA) Greening America’s Capitals program, with the goal of creating a more environmentally and economically sustainable design along the lower Grand Avenue corridor.

Happy Valley Road

Happy Valley Road is an east–west arterial road in the northern part of the Phoenix metropolitan area. The highway extends from 163rd Avenue in Surprise east to Seventh Street in Phoenix. Happy Valley Road is part of the National Highway System as a principal arterial from SR 303 to Interstate 17 (I-17).

Happy Valley Road begins at 163rd Avenue in Surprise. It travels east for six miles before intersecting Loop 303 (Bob Stump Memorial Parkway) at a single-point urban interchange in an unincorporated area west of Peoria. Happy Valley Road expands to six lanes east of Loop 303 and crosses the Agua Fria River into the city of Peoria. The highway intersects Lake Pleasant Parkway and passes along the south flank of Sunrise Mountain before crossing the New River. Shortly after entering the Deer Valley urban village of the city of Phoenix, Happy Valley Road becomes a four-lane road with center turn lane and passes to the south of Ludden Mountain. The highway expands to six lanes, crosses Skunk Creek, and meets I-17 (Arizona Veterans Highway) at a diverging diamond interchange. Happy Valley Road continues east from I-17 as a six-lane divided highway but then reduces to two lanes east of 19th Street. The highway crosses the Central Arizona Project aqueduct before curving south toward its end, where it seamlessly becomes Seventh Street.

Indian School Road
 
Indian School Road runs continuously east/west for approximately 41 miles with the Salt River Pima-Maricopa Indian Community at the east end and Buckeye & Maricopa County White Tank Mountain Regional Park at the west end. It intersects with Arizona State Route 101, Arizona State Route 51, Interstate 17, US 60/Grand Avenue and Arizona State Route 303. Though running predominantly through the metro Phoenix area, Indian School Road does continue west of the White Tank Mountains from approximately 27600 West to 41100 West (411th Avenue being an overpass and access to Tonopah and Interstate 10) to 46700 West, and from 48700 West to Harquahala Valley Road (52000 West).

Indian School Road was named in territorial days as the road to the Phoenix Indian School (1890-1991) located on the site of the present Steele Indian School Park.

Landmarks 
 Arcadia High School 4703 East. Past students include Steven Spielberg, Lynda Carter and Astronaut Bill Shepherd.
 Carl Hayden Veterans Administration Medical Center, 650 East, named after Arizona's first Representative (1912–27) and US Senator from Arizona (1927–169) succeeded by Barry Goldwater.
 Steele Indian School Park, 300 East. Original site of the Phoenix Indian School; there are historical buildings that were once part of the Indian School campus, specifically the Dining Hall, built in 1902, and Memorial Hall, built in 1922. More recently, this was the site of a fatal helicopter crash on July 27, 2007 when KTVK and KNXV choppers collided during a police chase, and wreckage landed in the park.
 Phoenix Air Haven Airport, 2700-3300 West, was located on the south side of the road from 1945 to 1960.  It is now an industrial office complex.
 Maryvale Mall 5100 West. Now closed, the site consists of two schools (an elementary and a middle) utilizing former buildings of the mall. A nearby Walmart Supercenter was built with a new structure.
 Verrado High School 20050 West.

Lake Pleasant Parkway

Lake Pleasant Parkway is an arterial road in the northwestern part of the Phoenix metropolitan area. The highway extends from the intersection of 83rd Avenue and Beardsley Road west and north to Arizona State Route 74 (SR 74), all within Peoria. The entire length of Lake Pleasant Parkway is part of the National Highway System as a principal arterial, along with the  section of 83rd Avenue from the southern end of Lake Pleasant Parkway south to Bell Road. The principal arterial segment of 83rd Avenue is also described in this section.

The principal arterial section of 83rd Avenue begins at Bell Road, which at that intersection forms the border of the cities of Peoria and Glendale. 83rd Avenue continues south fully into Peoria, where it serves the Peoria Sports Complex, the spring training home of the San Diego Padres and Seattle Mariners. From Bell Road, 83rd Avenue heads north fully into Glendale and passes to the west of Arrowhead Towne Center. The four-lane divided highway crosses over SR 101 (Agua Fria Freeway) without access; Bell Road has an interchange with the freeway just west of 83rd Avenue. 83rd Avenue parallels and then crosses the New River before reaching Union Hills Drive, which also provides access to SR 101. The avenue expands to six lanes as it continues into the city of Peoria to Beardsley Road, where the highway continues as Lake Pleasant Parkway. The parkway curves west; within the curve is an intersection with another section of 83rd Avenue, where the parkway reduces to four lanes. Lake Pleasant Parkway continues west until 98th Avenue, where the highway curves north. North of Happy Valley Road, the highway's surroundings gradually change to open desert. North of its diamond interchange with SR 303, Lake Pleasant Parkway reduces to two lanes and crosses the Central Arizona Project aqueduct. The highway passes to the east of Pleasant Valley Airport before reaching its northern terminus at SR 74, which heads west as Lake Pleasant Road and east as Carefree Highway.

Mill Avenue 

Mill Avenue is a historic street in Tempe. In north Tempe near Arizona State University, the street runs through a popular, pedestrian-friendly shopping and nightlife district. Mill Avenue was originally centered around the Hayden Flour Mill, which, while disused, still stands on the north end of the Avenue. Today, the avenue plays host to many bars, designer shopping stores, as well as many fairs, and city festivals. It was described in 2010 by a New York Times reporter as "a bohemian commercial strip next to Arizona State University".

At the northern end of the shopping district, the two Mill Avenue bridges cross the Salt River at Tempe Town Lake. One bridge was completed in 1931, the other in 1994.

History 

After the founding of Fort McDowell on the east side of central Arizona’s Salt River Valley in 1865, farmers moved into the area. These early settlers further developed the irrigation canals that the Hohokam people originally created and built new ones to carry Salt River water to their farms. Agriculture in the Salt River valley soon gave food to Arizona’s military posts and mining towns. In 1871, Hiram C. Hodge commented that there were two stores and a population of about 100 in Tempe.

A substantial addition to the Tempe economy was established in 1877, when Charles T. Hayden, a business man from Connecticut, opened a flour-mill operation that was supplied with water from the Tempe Irrigating Canal. Charles T. Hayden, and his family operated the mill for three full generations, and it was crucial to Tempe's community industry.

Also in 1877, Charles' son Carl Hayden, who was to become a congressman and then senator from Arizona, was born in the Hayden family home, a building which, after spending around 60 years as a restaurant, began restoration to its 1924-era state in 2014.

The Hayden's Ferry Post Office was renamed the Tempe Post Office in 1879. In 1889, the new Phoenix and Maricopa Railroad linked Tempe with Phoenix. In 1894, the Maricopa County Board of Supervisors incorporated the town of Tempe. Tempe finally became a city after being inhabited for over 30 years.

In 1962, the Laird and Dines Drug Store closed after 68 years of operation at the corner of Mill Avenue and Fifth Street. This drug store was one of the original fixtures on the commercial district of Mill Avenue. Tempe’s commercial center along Mill Avenue declined during these years.

In 1964, construction of the Grady Gammage Memorial Auditorium, designed by Frank Lloyd Wright, was completed at the intersection of Mill Avenue and Apache Boulevard on the campus of Arizona State University.

Prompted by Tempe’s centennial in 1971, Mill Avenue was revitalized into an entertainment and shopping district that attracts people from throughout the Phoenix Valley.

In 1997, the Hayden Flour Mill closed after 123 years of continuous operation. The mill's last operator was Bay State Milling, which had purchased it in 1981. It is significant as the oldest continuously used industrial site in the Salt River Valley.

Theaters 

The Valley Art Theater (operated by Harkins Theatres) is located on Mill Avenue as a comfortable single screen theater that typically shows art house and occasionally foreign films.  The current building was built in 1938, although it underwent substantial internal renovations in the 1990s.

AMC Centerpoint, an 11-screen complex, is also located on the avenue.  It was originally owned by Harkins; however, with the completion of the Tempe Marketplace, which provided a more modern building, Harkins closed it in January 2008. AMC reopened the Centerpoint in April 2014.

Northern Avenue

Northern Avenue is an east–west arterial road in the northwestern part of the Phoenix metropolitan area. The highway extends from the eastern end of Northern Parkway on the Glendale–El Mirage city line east to Arizona State Route 51 (SR 51) in Phoenix. All of Northern Avenue east of Northern Parkway is part of the National Highway System as a principal arterial.

Northern Avenue begins as an eastward continuation of Northern Parkway between Glendale to the south and El Mirage to the north. , the transition point between the similarly named highways is Dysart Road. Northern Avenue heads east as a four-lane divided highway with a wide median that is intended to fit the eastward extension of Northern Parkway. East of El Mirage Road, the carriageways come together and cross the Agua Fria River. East of the intermittent river, Northern Avenue becomes a four-lane road with center turn lane and begins to follow the Glendale–Peoria city line. East of the New River, the highway meets SR 101 (Agua Fria Freeway) at a diamond interchange. The highway fully enters Glendale west of its intersection with U.S. Route 60 (Grand Avenue). Northern Avenue intersects 51st Avenue shortly before entering the city of Phoenix, where the avenue forms the boundary between the urban villages of North Mountain to the north and Alhambra to the south. The highway meets Interstate 17 (Arizona Veterans Highway) at a single-point urban interchange. East of Seventh Street, Northern Avenue forms the boundary between the urban villages of North Mountain and Camelback East and veers from its east–west orientation as it approaches the Phoenix Mountains. Northern Avenue reaches its eastern terminus at a diamond interchange with SR 51 (Piestewa Freeway) on the west flank of Piestewa Peak.

Power Road

Power Road is a north–south arterial road in the southeastern part of the Phoenix metropolitan area. The highway extends from Hunt Highway at the Maricopa–Pinal county line in Chandler Heights to the north city limit of Mesa, where the road continues as Bush Highway. Power Road is part of the National Highway System as a principal arterial from Riggs Road in Chandler Heights to Thomas Road in Mesa.

Power Road heads north as a two-lane road from Hunt Highway, which follows the Maricopa–Pinal county line, through unincorporated Chandler Heights, at the north end of which the road intersects Riggs Road. North of Riggs Road, the highway mostly follows the border between the city of Queen Creek to the east and Gilbert to the west. South of Ocotillo Road, Power Road expands to a six-lane divided highway, which crosses Queen Creek south of Queen Creek Road. At Pecos Road, where a rail line passes diagonally through the intersection, the highway leaves Queen Creek and follows the border between Gilbert to the west and Mesa to the east. At Williams Field Road, the carriageways of Power Road temporarily diverge to cross the East Maricopa Floodway; Williams Field Road heads east toward Arizona State University Polytechnic campus and Phoenix–Mesa Gateway Airport.

North of the airport, Power Road has a diamond interchange with Arizona State Route 202 (SR 202; Santan Freeway) and reduces to a four-lane undivided highway with center turn lane. The highway intersects Elliot Road and expands to a six-lane divided highway again at a second crossing of the East Maricopa Floodway. Power Road fully enters Mesa at its intersection with Baseline Road. The highway passes through an S-curve and has a diamond interchange with U.S. Route 60 (Superstition Freeway). Power Road temporarily expands to eight lanes as it passes to the east of Superstition Springs Center from the freeway to Southern Avenue, then the six-lane highway passes to the east of Leisure World. North of McDowell Road, the highway has a partial interchange with SR 202 (Red Mountain Freeway) allowing access to and from the west; access to the other direction of SR 202 is provided by McDowell Road. Power Road parallels the Fannin-McFarland Aqueduct of the Central Arizona Project and reduces to four lanes for its final stretch through an intersection with Thomas Road to the north city limit of Mesa, where the road continues as Bush Highway.

Riggs Road

Riggs Road is an east–west arterial road in the southeastern part of the Phoenix metropolitan area. The highway extends from Beltline Road in the Gila River Indian Community south of Phoenix east through Sun Lakes, Chandler, and Gilbert to Rittenhouse Road in Queen Creek. Riggs Road is part of the National Highway System as a principal arterial from Interstate 10 (I-10) east to Ellsworth Road in Queens Creek.

Riggs Road begins as a continuation of Beltline Road where the latter highway curves from northwest–southeast to east–west within the Gila River Indian Community. The two-lane highway heads east through open desert and has an intersection with Arizona State Route 347 (SR 347; Maricopa Road) and a diamond interchange with I-10 (Maricopa Freeway). East of I-10, Riggs Road expands to four lanes with center turn lane and leaves the open desert at the border of the native reservation and the unincorporated community of Sun Lakes at 88th Street. After passing through Sun Lakes, the highway enters the city of Chandler and intersects SR 87 (Arizona Avenue), where the east–west road expands to a six-lane divided highway. Shortly after entering Gilbert, Riggs Road crosses the East Maricopa Floodway. The highway's median becomes a center turn lane as it enters Queen Creek. Riggs Road then reduces to four lanes at its intersection with Power Road on the north side of the unincorporated village of Chandler Heights. Beyond Ellsworth Road, the highway reduces to two lanes to its eastern terminus at Rittenhouse Road; the road continues as Combs Road and, just east of the intersection, crosses the Maricopa–Pinal county line.

Rural Road

Rural Road is a north–south arterial road in the southeastern part of the Phoenix metropolitan area. The highway extends from Chandler Boulevard in Chandler north to Rio Salado Parkway in Tempe, where the highway continues north as Scottsdale Road. Rural Road is part of the National Highway System as a principal arterial from Elliot Road north to Rio Salado Parkway within Tempe.

Rural Road begins as a four-lane divided highway at Chandler Boulevard in Chandler. At Ray Road, the highway enters Tempe and gains a third southbound lane and a center turn lane. Rural Road gains a third northbound lane at Warner Road and drops back to four lanes at the Western Canal. The highway expands to a six-lane divided highway at Baseline Road, passes through an S-curve, and meets U.S. Route 60 (Superstition Freeway) at a diamond interchange. North of the freeway, the highway's median becomes a center turn lane. North of Apache Boulevard, Rural Road passes through the Tempe campus of Arizona State University. Within the campus, the highway intersects the Valley Metro Rail light rail line and becomes a divided highway again. Rural Road ends and Scottsdale Road begins at Rio Salado Boulevard at the north end of the university campus.

Scottsdale Road

Scottsdale Road is a north–south arterial road in the northeastern part of the Phoenix metropolitan area. The highway extends from Rio Salado Parkway in Tempe, where the highway continues south as Rural Road, north to Carefree Highway in northern Scottsdale. The full length of Scottsdale Road is part of the National Highway System as a principal arterial.

Scottsdale Road begins and Rural Road ends at Rio Salado Parkway at the north end of the Tempe campus of Arizona State University. Scottsdale Road heads north as a six-lane divided highway that immediately crosses over the Salt River. North of the river, the highway has a single-point urban interchange with Arizona State Route 202 (SR 202; Red Mountain Freeway). Scottsdale Road leaves Tempe and enters Scottsdale at McKellips Road. Through downtown Scottsdale, two parallel roads split from and rejoin Scottsdale Road—Drinkwater Boulevard to the east and Goldwater Boulevard to the west—and Scottsdale Road carries four lanes through downtown, where the highway intersects Indian School Road. North of downtown Scottsdale, the highway passes along the east side of the town of Paradise Valley and passes through Central Scottsdale, where the road intersects Shea Boulevard. North of Cactus Road, Scottsdale Road forms the border between the Paradise Valley urban village of Phoenix to the west and Scottsdale to the east. The highway passes to the west of Scottsdale Airport between Thunderbird Road and the intersection with the east end of Bell Road and the west end of Frank Lloyd Wright Boulevard. Immediately north of the intersection, Scottsdale Road crosses the Central Arizona Project aqueduct and borders the Desert View urban village of Phoenix on the west. At its diamond interchange with SR 101 (Pima Freeway), the highway becomes a four-lane highway with center turn lane through a mix of open desert and subdivisions. Scottsdale Road fully enters the city of Scottsdale and becomes a divided highway shortly before its northern terminus at a three-legged intersection with Carefree Highway. The road continues north into Carefree as Tom Darlington Drive.

Shea Boulevard

Shea Boulevard is an east–west arterial road in the northeastern part of the Phoenix metropolitan area. The highway extends  from 21st Place in Phoenix east through Scottsdale to Arizona State Route 87 (SR 87) just east of Fountain Hills. Shea Boulevard is part of the National Highway System as a principal arterial from SR 51 east to SR 87 (Beeline Highway).

Shea Boulevard begins at its curve onto 21st Place on the east flank of Stoney Mountain, part of the Phoenix Mountains in the Paradise Valley urban village of the city of Phoenix. The highway heads east as a two-lane suburban road that expands to a four-lane highway with center turn lane east of 24th Street. Shea Boulevard passes Shadow Mountain High School and has a single-point urban interchange with SR 51 (Piestewa Freeway). The highway expands to a six-lane divided highway east of 40th Street. Between its intersection with Tatum Boulevard in the commercial center of Paradise Valley and a stream to the east, Shea Boulevard runs along the northern edge of the town of Paradise Valley. The highway enters the city of Scottsdale and passes along the east–west part of the city known as Central Scottsdale or the Shea Corridor. Shea Boulevard intersects Scottsdale Road in another commercial area and has a single-point urban interchange with SR 101 (Pima Freeway). East of Frank Lloyd Wright Boulevard, which heads north to Taliesin West, the highway crosses the Central Arizona Project aqueduct. East of the Scottsdale campus of Mayo Clinic Arizona, Shea Boulevard veers from its straight east–west course and passes through the southern end of the McDowell Mountains into the town of Fountain Hills, where the road reduces to four lanes at Fountain Hills Boulevard. The highway curves southeast and exits the town into the Salt River Pima–Maricopa Indian Community before reaching its eastern terminus at AZ 87 (Beeline Highway).

Sun Valley Parkway
Sun Valley Parkway is mainly located in Buckeye, with a small portion extending into Surprise, Arizona.

Built in the 1980s, the four-lane divided parkway traverses approximately 30 miles of what was once open desert about 35 miles west of downtown Phoenix. It extends north–south from Interstate 10 at exit 109 (Sun Valley Parkway / Palo Verde Road) in Buckeye, turns after about 12 miles or so to become an east–west road, and leads eastward to Surprise, where the road connects to and becomes Bell Road through Surprise and other West Valley suburbs (and eventually the City of Phoenix itself).

Developments 

There are a number of master-planned communities located along this roadway in Buckeye (after no development occurred in the area for several years after the road was built). Currently being built are Tartesso and Sun City Festival. Other communities in the planning stages include Sun Valley, Sun Valley South, Spurlock Ranch, Elianto, Trillium in Buckeye and Douglas Ranch.

See also 
 Mill Avenue Bridges
 Tempe Town Lake

References

External links 
 The Arizona Republic article on Sun Valley Parkway developments
 City of Buckeye

Transportation in Maricopa County, Arizona
Transportation in Phoenix, Arizona
Transportation in Peoria, Arizona
Transportation in Glendale, Arizona
Transportation in Scottsdale, Arizona